Charles McCormick Building is a historic commercial building located at South Bend, St. Joseph County, Indiana.  It was built in 1904, and is a two-story, rectangular, brick building on a concrete and stone foundation. It housed commercial enterprises on the first floor and apartments on the second.

It was listed on the National Register of Historic Places in 1999.

References

Commercial buildings on the National Register of Historic Places in Indiana
Commercial buildings completed in 1904
Buildings and structures in South Bend, Indiana
National Register of Historic Places in St. Joseph County, Indiana